Artivism is a portmanteau word combining art and activism, and is sometimes also referred to as Social Artivism.

The term artivism in US English takes roots, or branches, off of a 1997 gathering between Chicano artists from East Los Angeles and the Zapatistas in Chiapas, Mexico. The words "Artivist" and "Artivism" were popularized through a variety of events, actions and artworks via artists and musicians such as Quetzal, Ozomatli, and Mujeres de Maiz, among other East Los Angeles artists, and at spaces such as Self Help Graphics & Art.

Artivism further developed as antiwar and anti-globalization protests emerged and proliferated. In many cases artivists attempt to push political agendas by the means of art, but a focus on raising social, environmental, and technical awareness is also common. 

Besides using traditional mediums like film and music to raise awareness or push for change, an artivist can also be involved in culture jamming, subvertising, street art, spoken word, protesting, and activism.

Artivist Eve Ensler stated:
... This passion has all the ingredients of activism, but is charged with the wild creations of art. Artivism—where edges are pushed, imagination is freed, and a new language emerges altogether." Bruce Lyons has written: "... artivism ... promotes the essential understanding that ... [humans] ... can, through courageous creative expression, experience the unifying power of love when courage harnesses itself to the task of art + social responsibility.

 

By 2005, the term had made its way into academic writing when Slovenian theatre scholar Aldo Milohnic used the term to discuss "autonomous ('alter-globalist', social) movements in Slovenia that attracted wide attention. In carrying out their political activity they made use of protests and direct actions, thereby introducing the 'aesthetic', willingly or not". In 2008, Chela Sandoval and Guisela Latorre published a piece on Chicano/a artivism and M. K. Asante using the term in reference to Black artists.

There is a chapter on artivism in the book It's Bigger Than Hip Hop by M. K. Asante. Asante writes of the artivist: 
The artivist (artist + activist) uses their artistic talents to fight and struggle against injustice and oppression—by any medium necessary. The artivist merges commitment to freedom and justice with the pen, the lens, the brush, the voice, the body, and the imagination. The artivist knows that to make an observation is to have an obligation.

The impact of artivism vs. conventional activism was tested in a public scientific experiment in Copenhagen, Denmark, in 2018. The results, reported in the journal of Social Movement Studies, suggest that artivism may be more effective than conventional activism.

Artivists
Some of the artivists or self-identified as artists-activists (with Wikipedia pages)  

Above
Ai Weiwei
Aloe Blacc
Annie Sprinkle
Anomie Belle
Banksy
Bleepsgr
Daniel Arzola (Spanish)
Deborah De Robertis
Deeyah Khan
Ernest Zacharevic
Favianna Rodriguez
Gianluca Costantini
Guillermo Gómez-Peña
JoFF Rae
JR
Jeanmarie Simpson
Judy Baca
Julio Salgado
Kwame Akoto-Bamfo
Las Cafeteras
Lila Downs
Lost Children of Babylon
Lydia Canaan
Lynnette Haozous
Martha Gonzalez
Marina DeBris
Martin Aveling 
Maya Jupiter
Michel Platnic
Milo Moiré
Norm Magnusson
Pavel 183
Peter Joseph
Quetzal (band)
Reverend Billy and the Church of Stop Shopping
Sabo_(street_artist)
Self Help Graphics & Art
Tania Bruguera
Tinkebell
Valie Export
Walela Nehanda
Will St Leger

Collectives and organizations
Artivists often work in interdisciplinary collectives that are stand alone or operate as a 'creative' part of the greater activists groups like for example Gran Fury of AIDS Coalition to Unleash Power (ACT UP). 
Artivist Film Festival
Crass
Da! collective
Pangaeseed Foundation 
Red Rebel Brigade
The Fearless Collective
The Yes Men
Sol Collective

See also
The arts and politics
Invisible theater
Social center
Timeline of Extinction Rebellion actions
Whirl-Mart

References

Contemporary art
Activism
Culture jamming
Political art
DIY culture